Rituals: Live in Japan is a live CD by Painkiller, a band featuring John Zorn, Bill Laswell, and Mick Harris, performing live in Tokyo in 1991 with guest guitar and vocals from Haino Keiji. The album was released on the Japanese label Toy's Factory in 1993.

It contains two performance "sets" by the band: "First Set" tracks 1–10 and "Second Set" tracks 11–17.

Track listing

Personnel 
 John Zorn – alto saxophone, vocals
 Bill Laswell – bass
 Mick Harris – drums, vocals
 Haino Keiji – guitar, vocals (tracks 9, 10, 15, 16 and 17)

Technical personnel 

 Recorded live on September 26, 1991 at La Mama, Tokyo
 Engineer – Makito Takashi
 Digital editing – Scott Hull
 Mastered by Howie Weinberg

References 

Painkiller (band) albums
Albums produced by John Zorn
John Zorn live albums
1993 live albums